Mark Keppel High School (MKHS) is a four-year California Distinguished School located in the city of Alhambra, California, in the Alhambra Unified School District. The school is on the southern edge of Alhambra, adjacent to the city of Monterey Park, and borders the Interstate 10 Freeway. Mark Keppel serves students from portions of Alhambra and Monterey Park. Mark Keppel has been accredited by the Western Association of Schools and Colleges in 1996, 2002, 2008, and 2014.

History
Mark Keppel High School is named after Mark Keppel, Superintendent of Los Angeles County Schools from 1902 to 1928. Construction began December 19, 1938, three days after the ground-breaking ceremonies. The school was one of the thousands of projects built by the Public Works Administration during the Great Depression.

Awards
California Distinguished School Award: 2005
Exemplary Career Technical Education Award: 2005
Title I Academic Achievement Award: 2004, 2005, 2006
Governor's Performance Award: 2001, 2002, 2003
Ranked 451 on Newsweek's 1,000 "Best High Schools in America": 2004
First Place in LA County Academic Decathlon: 2008
Third Place in LA County Science Olympiad: 2012
First Place in LA County Academic Decathlon: 2014
Second Place in LA County Academic Decathlon: 2019
First Place in LA County Academic Decathlon: 2020
Third Place in California State Academic Decathlon: 2020 
First Place in LA County Academic Decathlon: 2021
Third Place in California State Academic Decathlon: 2021
GetLit Poetry Slam Champions: 2022

Demographics
As of the 20142015 school year, the student body was 72% Asian American, 22% Hispanic or Latino (of any race), and 1% non-Hispanic White. The remaining 5% consisted of Filipino, African-American, Native American, Pacific Islander, and other students. The predominant languages spoken at students' homes are Cantonese, Mandarin and Spanish. Approximately 60% of the student population participates in a free or reduced lunch program, while 25% of the students participate in ESL.

Extracurricular activities

Visual and performing arts
In 2007, band and orchestra teacher Dr. Carla Bartlett won the Performing Arts Center of Los Angeles County's Bravo Award as an in the Arts Specialist division, one of the highlights of her career. Leading the District Band along with rival Alhambra High School's Mark Trulson and San Gabriel High School's Tammy Cognetta, Dr. Bartlett and the marching band qualified to participate in the 2009 Tournament of Roses Parade.

Justin Lee, a UCLA graduate, now directs the school's band and orchestra, following Dr. Bartlett's retirement in December 2016.

The school has an active theatre arts program led by Nadine Page Phillips. Plays, musicals, and other performances occur throughout the school year, often in conjunction with the school orchestra. In 2015, Mark Keppel High theatre students were invited to the Edinburgh Festival Fringe in Scotland where they performed in a rendition of Peter Pan. Various UC "A-G" certified programs such as AP Art History are offered.

Previously, the school also had their own concert choir and show choir, led by their teacher and director Tony Azeltine. The competitive advanced group, known as "Aztec Singers," competed in various show choir competitions across Los Angeles. About once a year, the students would travel out-of-state to perform or compete with other show choir and concert choir students across the continent.

Athletics
The Varsity football team, under coach Eddie Wagner, beat Pasadena High School 19-13 for the 1944 CIF-SS Championship at the Los Angeles Coliseum.

Mark Keppel has established itself as one of the premier co-ed Badminton schools in Southern California in the late 1980s and throughout the 1990s. The badminton team has won CIF-SS championships in 1987 (3-A), 1990 (3-A), 1991 (3-A), 1992 (3-A), 1993 (I), 1994 (I), 1996 (I), 1997 (I), 1998 (I), and 2010 (I).

Both the Aztec Boys and Girls Varsity swim teams won back-to-back CIF-SS Division IV championships in the 2007 and 2008 season. The Girls Varsity swim and dive team won the CIF-SS Division III championships in the 2010 season. In addition, the Aztecs have captured the Division 3 CIF-SS championship 2011 in both Boys and Girls.

The boys Varsity soccer team of 1979 won the CIF-SS Division III championship by beating Orange County's University High School by the score of 4-2. This was the first CIF title for the school in any sport during the previous 25 years.

Publications
Mark Keppel High School's journalism class runs the monthly newspaper, The Aztec. The yearbook is Teocalli, named after the Aztec temple, and comes out once a year several months before summer break begins. Until June 2016, "Idea Magazine" was a student-run, biannual compilation of Mark Keppel students' work in literature and art, advised by AP English teacher Mrs. Patrice Flores. "U Magazine" is a registered student publications club, also advised by Mrs. Flores, for the school year 2016–2017.

Architecture
Mark Keppel High School is designed in the Streamline Moderne architectural style, a variant of the Art Deco, and a product of the Great Depression. While the Art Deco celebrated the mechanization of the Jazz Age with big, bold, vertical designs, exotic materials, and elaborate decorations, the Streamline Moderne was a more reserved and utilitarian style. The Streamline Moderne mimicked the fast, dynamic look of machines with sleek, aerodynamic and nautical forms, low horizontal designs, rounded corners, and shiny materials.

The architecture of Mark Keppel High School features rounded corners in and outside the auditorium, on the staircase leading up to the front entrance, and in all the interior stairwells. Incised horizontal lines cut through the brick stringcourse which wraps the lower part of the building and the brick pillars between the windows. The stucco texture coat of the facade features designs that emphasize horizontal shapes; blocks between the windows on both floors and along the top of the building contribute to the geometric, yet sleek look of the building. The uppermost block is bounded by a horizontal brick band, and the building is crowned with a small inset ledge. Extra handrails are found in front of the windows in the second floor hallways, in front of the display cases around the administration offices, and on the north wing exterior staircase.

Murals
Mark Keppel High School features three bas relief murals made by native Southern California artist, Millard Sheets.

The three enamel on stainless steel murals entitled "Early California" decorate the exterior of the auditorium, and depict the founding of California as well as the regional features of Los Angeles County. The second image show the placement of the two smaller murals on the auditorium.

The largest mural crowns the entrance to the auditorium and depicts the three main groups that colonized and populated California: the Spanish Conquistadors, the Catholic Missionaries, and American Pioneers. The mural features a golden California on a backdrop of green mountain ranges, dotted with golden Redwood trees, and capped with a large reflective stainless steel sun wrapped with a sunburst decoration. On the left, the Conquistador goes before his ship, claiming the new land in the name of Spain. In the center, a Missionary kneels down, gingerly placing a mission in Southern California. On the right, a Miner 49’er pans for gold while his wife holds their child and rifle, their covered wagons behind them.

The two smaller murals are located on the southern facade of the auditorium, facing toward Hellman Ave. The mural in the center right depicts early Los Angeles County with the San Gabriel Mountains to the north, the San Gabriel Mission surrounded by orange groves in the center, a dairy farm with Cowboy below, and the Long Beach Harbor in the south.

The mural on the right showcases the entire state of California. From north to south: a lumberjack cuts down a Redwood tree, two miners pan for gold, and a farmer harvests oranges from his orange grove. A cowboy gallops in on a white horse from the east, while a large ship sails in majestically from the west.

Notable alumni
Mike McCormick (pitcher) (b. 1938)— baseball player, CY Young Award Winner 
 Hank Aguirre (1949) — baseball player 
 Pete Mikkelsen (b. 1939) — baseball player
 Luis J. Rodriguez (b. 1954) — poet, novelist, journalist, critic, and columnist
 Hope Sandoval (b. 1966) — singer 
 Dick Frey (b. 1929)  — football player 
 B. Wayne Hughes (1951) — Founder and director of Public Storage, a self-storage company 
 Terence Yin (1993) — actor 
 John Tran (1993) — politician, mayor of Rosemead 
 Larry Burright — baseball player  
 Justin Young (basketball) (2011) — basketball player

References

External links

Mark Keppel High School
California Department of Education API reports

San Gabriel Valley
High schools in Los Angeles County, California
Educational institutions established in 1938
Streamline Moderne architecture in California
Public high schools in California
Alhambra, California
1938 establishments in California